2009 Voloshina, provisional designation , is a carbonaceous asteroid from the outer regions of the asteroid belt, approximately 27 kilometers in diameter.

It was discovered on 22 October 1968, by Russian astronomer Tamara Smirnova at the Crimean Astrophysical Observatory in Nauchnyj, on the Crimean peninsula. The asteroid was named for WWII partisan Vera Voloshina.

Classification and orbit 

Voloshina orbits the Sun in the outer main-belt at a distance of 2.7–3.6 AU once every 5 years and 6 months (2,009 days). Its orbit has an eccentricity of 0.14 and an inclination of 3° with respect to the ecliptic.

Its observation arc begins at Heidelberg, 62 years prior to its official discovery observation.

Physical characteristics 

Voloshina has been characterized as a carbonaceous C-type asteroid by Pan-STARRS photometric survey.

Lightcurves 

In May 2009, a rotational lightcurve of Voloshina was obtained from photometric observations by astronomers at the Oakley Southern Sky Observatory in Australia. Lightcurve analysis gave a rotation period of 5.896 hours with a brightness variation of 0.40 magnitude.

Diameter and albedo 

According to the surveys carried out by the Infrared Astronomical Satellite IRAS, the Japanese Akari satellite, and NASA's Wide-field Infrared Survey Explorer with its subsequent NEOWISE mission, Voloshina measures between 21.19 and 34.8 kilometers in diameter and its surface has an albedo between 0.0698 and 0.120.

The Collaborative Asteroid Lightcurve Link derives an albedo of 0.0487 and calculates a diameter of 34.67 kilometers based on an absolute magnitude of 11.2.

An occultation of a star by 2009 Voloshina was observed in 2021.

Naming 

This minor planet was named in honor of Vera Danilovna Voloshina (1919–1941), a partisan of the Soviet Great Patriotic War (1941–1945), also known as the Eastern Front of the Second World War. The official  was published by the Minor Planet Center on 1 September 1978.

References

External links 
 Asteroid Lightcurve Database (LCDB), query form (info )
 Dictionary of Minor Planet Names, Google books
 Asteroids and comets rotation curves, CdR – Observatoire de Genève, Raoul Behrend
 Discovery Circumstances: Numbered Minor Planets (1)-(5000) – Minor Planet Center
 
 

002009
Discoveries by Tamara Mikhaylovna Smirnova
Named minor planets
19681022